Chanthou Oeuror Chakra Oeur also known as O'Bon, is a Cambodian painter and sculptor who has lived in the United States since the 1980s.

References

External links
https://web.archive.org/web/20070927050146/http://www.providence.edu/art/cambodian/oeur.html

Cambodian artists
Cambodian sculptors
American people of Cambodian descent
Living people
20th-century Cambodian artists
21st-century Cambodian artists
Year of birth missing (living people)
Buddhist artists